Pierce College station, signed as Pierce College/Winnetka, is a station on the G Line of the Los Angeles Metro Busway system.  It is named after the adjacent  community college of the same name, which is located on Winnetka Avenue, immediately across Victory Boulevard from the station. The station lies on the border between the Los Angeles districts of Winnetka, and Woodland Hills.

Service

Station Layout

Hours and frequency

Connections 
, the following connections are available:
 Los Angeles Metro Bus: ,

Nearby destinations 
The station is within walking distance of the following notable places:
 Canoga Bowl
 Los Angeles Pierce College
 Metro Orange Line bicycle path
 West Valley Occupational Center

References

External links 

Los Angeles Metro Busway stations
G Line (Los Angeles Metro)
Los Angeles Pierce College
Winnetka, Los Angeles
Woodland Hills, Los Angeles
Public transportation in the San Fernando Valley
Public transportation in Los Angeles
Bus stations in Los Angeles
2005 establishments in California